Nacer Guedioura (4 November 1954) is an Algerian former professional footballer who played as a forward. and had 2 caps and two goals for the Algeria national football team. He is the father of Algerian international Adlène Guedioura.

Life and career

International
Guedioura played only two games with the national team first cap was against South Yemen in 1973 Palestine Cup of Nations and scored two goals the game ended a record 15–1, the Algerian team's biggest victory, the second and the last game was against Sweden.

Honours

Club
 USM Alger
 Algerian Cup (1): 1980-81

References

External links
Profile on usm-alger.com site
 

1954 births
Algerian footballers
Algeria international footballers
Footballers from Algiers
USM Alger players
Living people
Association football forwards
21st-century Algerian people
Algerian emigrants to France